Cynophalla is a genus of flowering plants in the caper family, Capparaceae, of about 20 species that are shrubs, trees, or vines.

Species include:
Cynophalla amazonica Iltis
Cynophalla didymobotrys (Ruiz & Pav. ex DC.) Cornejo & Iltis
Cynophalla ecuadorica (Iltis) Iltis & Cornejo
Cynophalla flexuosa (L.) J.Presl
Cynophalla hastata (Jacq.) J.Presl
Cynophalla heterophylla (Ruiz & Pav. ex DC.) Iltis & Cornejo
Cynophalla linearis (Jacq.) J.Presl
Cynophalla mattogrossensis (Pilg.) Cornejo & Iltis
Cynophalla polyantha (Triana & Planch.) Cornejo & Iltis
Cynophalla retusa (Griseb.) Cornejo & Iltis
Cynophalla sclerophylla (Iltis & Cornejo) Cornejo & Iltis
Cynophalla sessilis (Banks ex DC.) J.Presl
Cynophalla tarapotensis (Eichler) Cornejo & Iltis
Cynophalla verrucosa (Jacq.) J.Presl

References

 
Brassicales genera